Six ships and one shore establishment of the Royal Navy have borne the name HMS Dartmouth, after the port of Dartmouth, whilst another two were planned:

  was a 22-gun ship launched in 1655. She was converted to a fireship in 1688, and rebuilt as a fifth rate in 1689. She was wrecked in the Sound of Mull in 1690.
  was a 4-gun fireship captured in 1672 and sold in 1674. 
  was a 48-gun fourth rate launched in 1693. She was captured by France in 1695, recaptured in 1702, and renamed HMS Vigo.  She was wrecked in 1703.
  was a 50-gun fourth rate launched in 1698.  She was rebuilt in 1741 and sunk in action with the Spanish ship Glorioso in 1747.
 HMS Dartmouth (1746) was to have been a 50-gun fourth rate. She was ordered in 1746, but was cancelled in 1748.
  was a 36-gun fifth rate launched in 1813. She was used for harbour service from 1831 and was broken up in 1854.
 HMS Dartmouth (1860) was to have been a wood screw frigate.  She was laid down in 1860 but was cancelled in 1864.
  was a  cruiser of the Weymouth subgroup launched in 1911.  She served in the First World War and was sold for scrap in 1930.
HMS Dartmouth (shore establishment) is the name of the Britannia Royal Naval College naval shore establishment

See also
Dartmouth (disambiguation)

Royal Navy ship names